Ernest William Turner (15 July 1876 – 7 December 1943) was an Australian politician.

He was born in Hobart. In 1931 he was elected to the Tasmanian House of Assembly as a Nationalist member for Denison. He was defeated in 1937 but returned in 1941 in a recount following Arndell Lewis's resignation. He was defeated again at the 1941 state election.

References

1876 births
1943 deaths
Nationalist Party of Australia members of the Parliament of Tasmania
Members of the Tasmanian House of Assembly